Tehumin (Tehumin being an acronym for Torah Hevrah UMedINa, lit. Torah, Society and State) is a Hebrew-language annual journal of articles about Jewish law and Modernity.

History
Tehumin is published in Israel by the Zomet Institute. It has appeared every year since its creation in 1980. Selected articles From Tehumin have been translated into English and published as Crossroads: Halacha and the Modern World.

The journal deals with:
Shabbat and Jewish holiday
Law and Justice
Army and Security.
Medicine and Medical ethics
Marriage and Family law

References

External links
An online database of Tehumin 

Judaic studies journals
Religious Zionism
Modern Orthodox Judaism